Richard Verrall (born 1948) is a British Holocaust denier and former deputy chairman of the British National Front (NF) who edited the magazine Spearhead from 1976 to 1980. Under the nom de plume (pen name) of Richard E. Harwood, Verrall wrote the pamphlet Did Six Million Really Die?

National Front involvement
Verrall studied history at Westfield College, now part of Queen Mary University of London, obtaining a first class honours degree. Initially a member of the Conservative Party, Verrall left in the early 1970s, along with a number of members on the right who supported Enoch Powell, to join the NF. Initially a close supporter of John Tyndall, he was appointed Spearhead editor by Tyndall and used the magazine to deny the Holocaust. He was also known for his endorsement of eugenics and biological determinism, adding to this theory that it was equally natural for members of a genetic group to sacrifice themselves for the benefit of others of the same group, thus attacking the criticism that the notion of sacrifice makes this theory inapplicable to humanity.

Despite his initial support for Tyndall, Verrall did not follow him into the New National Front and indeed was appointed deputy chairman of the NF by Andrew Brons in 1980. Although appointed to this role Verrall, played little further role in the politics of the NF and was aloof from the struggle between the Official National Front and the Flag Group. Instead, he concentrated most of his efforts on writing about the Holocaust.

Holocaust denial career
Verrall is best known today for his pamphlet (under the assumed name of Richard Harwood) Did Six Million Really Die?, a Holocaust denial pamphlet which was the subject of the criminal action brought against its Canadian-based German publisher Ernst Zündel. The trial court found the pamphlet to be composed of fabrications and distortions. The Supreme Court of Canada ruled that the book "misrepresented the work of historians, misquoted witnesses, fabricated evidence, and cited non-existent authorities".

In 2017, Amazon in the UK removed the entry for Did Six Million Really Die? from the offerings on its site after many years of having carried it.

Personal life
Verrall is married to Tessa Sempik, a solicitor, and they were mentioned in a 1996 article about tenancy law.

See also
Ernst Zündel
National Front (United Kingdom)

References

External links
Renton, D., Fascism and Anti-Fascism in Britain
Holocaust Denial on Trial

1948 births
Living people
Alumni of Westfield College
Pseudonymous writers
British Holocaust deniers
English male journalists
English neo-Nazis
National Front (UK) politicians